The list of ship launches in 2016 includes a chronological list of ships launched in 2016.


See also

References

2016
Ship launches
 
Ship launches